Robert Aaron Gordon (born Aaron Goldstein; July 26, 1908 – April 7, 1978) was an American economist. He was a professor of economics at the University of California, Berkeley from 1938 to 1976. In 1975, he served as president of the American Economic Association.

He was married to economist Margaret Gordon (1910–94). Both of their sons, Robert J. Gordon and David M. Gordon, became notable economists as well.

In 1959, with funding from the Ford Foundation, Gordon and James Edwin Howell  published Higher Education for Business, later known as the Gordon-Howell report.  
It is considered a key event in the history of business management and its development as a profession.  The report gave detailed recommendations for treating management as a science and improving the academic quality of business schools. 
The next thirty years are sometimes referred to as a “Golden Age” in which quantitative social science research became an established part of business schools.

References

External links
 

1908 births
1978 deaths
People from Washington, D.C.
20th-century American economists
Johns Hopkins University alumni
Harvard University alumni
University of California, Berkeley College of Letters and Science faculty
Presidents of the American Economic Association
Distinguished Fellows of the American Economic Association